Homocodon is a genus of plants in the family Campanulaceae. It contains two known species, native to the mountains of southwestern China and Bhutan.

 Homocodon brevipes (Hemsl.) D.Y.Hong - Bhutan, Guizhou, Sichuan, Yunnan
 Homocodon pedicellatum D.Y.Hong & L.M.Ma - Sichuan

References

Campanuloideae
Campanulaceae genera